Edwina Keane (born 1990) is a camogie player and student, All Ireland Champion 2016. She played in the 2009 All Ireland camogie final and was a Purcell All Star award winner in 2010. The Leinster 'Young Player of the Year' in 2008, Edwina added the I.T. Tralee 'Sportsperson of the Year' award for the academic year 2008-'09 to her collection. She has won three All- Ireland Minor titles as well as two Under-16s, and Leinster medals in all under-age grades. A National League title-holder from last year. Her senior debut was in 2006.

References

External links 
 Official Camogie Website
 Kilkenny Camogie Website
 Review of 2009 championship in On The Ball Official Camogie Magazine
 https://web.archive.org/web/20091228032101/http://www.rte.ie/sport/gaa/championship/gaa_fixtures_camogie_oduffycup.html Fixtures and results] for the 2009 O'Duffy Cup
 All-Ireland Senior Camogie Championship: Roll of Honour
 Video highlights of 2009 championship Part One and part two
 Video Highlights of 2009 All Ireland Senior Final
 Report of All Ireland final in Irish Times Independent and Examiner

1991 births
Living people
Kilkenny camogie players